The following is a list of books and essays by and/or about David Lynch:

Books by Lynch
 Images (1994)
 Distorted Nudes (2004)
 Catching the Big Fish (2006)
 The Air Is on Fire (2007)
 Snowmen (2007) 
 Dark Night of the Soul (2010)
 Genealogies of Pain (2011)
 Nudes (2017) 
 Room to Dream (2018)

Books about Lynch

References

Books about film directors
Works by David Lynch